The  was a field army of the Imperial Japanese Army during World War II.

History
The Japanese 2nd Area Army was formed on July 4, 1942 under the control of the Kwantung Army as a reserve and garrison force to maintain security and public order in Manchukuo. It was disbanded on June 13, 1945, and its various components were reassigned to other commands.

The 2nd Area Army was transferred to the Davao in the Philippines in late 1943, and tasked with defending western New Guinea and the eastern part of the occupied Netherlands East Indies.

List of Commanders

Commanding officer

Chief of Staff

References

2
Military units and formations established in 1942
Military units and formations disestablished in 1945